Roger Leslie Berry (born 4 July 1948) is a British Labour Party politician, who was the Member of Parliament (MP) for Kingswood from the 1992 general election ending at the 2010 general election.

Early life
Roger Berry was born in 1948 in Huddersfield and educated at the Dalton County Primary School on Mayfield Avenue in Huddersfield; Huddersfield New College; the University of Bristol, where he obtained a BSc in Economics in 1970; and the University of Sussex where he was awarded a DPhil in Economics in 1977. 
Berry lectured in Economics at the School of African and Asian Studies in London from 1973–4; Institute of Development Studies at the University of Sussex from 1973–4; the University of Papua New Guinea from 1974–8; and the University of Bristol from 1978–92. He was elected as a councillor to the Avon County Council in 1981, becoming the deputy in 1985 and the group leader in from 1986–92; he stood down from the council in 1993.

Parliamentary career
Berry contested Weston-super-Mare at the 1983 General Election but was defeated by Jerry Wiggin. Berry also unsuccessfully fought the seat of Bristol for the European Parliament in 1984.

Berry was selected to contest the marginal seat of Kingswood at the 1987 General Election and was defeated by Robert Hayward by over 4,000 votes. Berry again contested Kingswood against Hayward at the 1992 General Election and this time was victorious, winning the seat with a majority of 2,370. He made his maiden speech on 10 June 1992.

Berry was a frequent "rebel" against the Labour government since 1997. He was a Member of the Trade and Industry Committee. On 17 January 2007, he criticised the government for halting a corruption inquiry into arms sales to Saudi Arabia, saying it would do irreparable damage to
Britain's reputation.

In December 2007 Berry added his name to a petition to save the threatened Cadbury's Somerdale Factory from demolition. The petition urges for English Heritage to protect the historic birthplace of modern chocolate production.

Early on in his parliamentary career, Berry became known as a disability rights activist, and was Secretary and Co-Chair of the All Party Parliamentary Disability Group.

Berry lost his seat to Conservative Party candidate Chris Skidmore in the 2010 General Election. The seat was not very high among the Tory targets, and his unseating was the result of a swing of nearly 10% in favour of the Tories, with Labour Party officials blaming his defeat on a restructuring of constituency boundaries which were seen to favour the Tory vote. Under the average swing of 3.7% in that election, Labour would have held the seat.

Since losing his seat, Berry has become a Trustee of the charity Disability Rights UK. and is Chair of the Avon & Bristol Law Centre.

Personal life
He married Alison Delyth in December 1996 in Pontypridd.

References

External links 
 Website of Roger Berry MP
 
 Guardian Unlimited Politics – Ask Aristotle: Roger Berry MP
 TheyWorkForYou.com – Roger Berry MP
 The Public Whip – Roger Berry MP voting record
 BBC Politics page

News items
 2000 Budget

1948 births
Living people
Politics of Bristol
Politics of South Gloucestershire District
Labour Party (UK) MPs for English constituencies
Councillors in South West England
UK MPs 1992–1997
UK MPs 1997–2001
UK MPs 2001–2005
UK MPs 2005–2010
British disability rights activists
People from Huddersfield
Alumni of the University of Sussex
Academic staff of the University of Papua New Guinea
People educated at Huddersfield New College